Twin Lakes is a pair of lakes in the U.S. state of Wisconsin.

Twin Lakes was named for the fact there are two lakes side by side.

References

Lakes of Wisconsin
Bodies of water of Portage County, Wisconsin